Jan Holý (born March 11, 1995) is a Slovak professional ice hockey player. He is currently playing for HC Plzeň of the Czech Extraliga.

Holý made his Czech Extraliga debut playing with HC Plzeň during the 2013-14 Czech Extraliga season.

References

External links

1995 births
Living people
HC Plzeň players
Czech ice hockey defencemen
Sportspeople from Plzeň
HC Dukla Jihlava players
HC Slavia Praha players
HC Stadion Litoměřice players